Natin99 is the Eraserheads' sixth studio album. It was released by BMG Records (Pilipinas), Inc. in 1999 and the first Eraserheads album that came out of a non-linear recording approach, in which most of the musical parts were recorded separately in their respective home studios and pieced together by the band and producer Robin Rivera. Its title is a play on words for the year 1999.

Title 
The album's title is a word play on 1999, with "19" being replaced with "natin" (the Filipino term for "our").

Track listing 

 In the original release, "United Natins (Immigration Interrogation Doughpdog Mix) was a hidden track in "Game! Tama Na" appearing three seconds after it ends. It later appeared as a separate track and was listed on the 2010 retrospective box set "The Heads Set".

Personnel

Eraserheads
Ely Buendia – lead vocals, rhythm guitar
Buddy Zabala – bass guitar, backing vocals
Marcus Adoro – lead guitar, backing vocals
Raimund Marasigan – drums, backing vocals

Production
Robin Rivera – production
Eraserheads – production
Rudy Tee  – executive producer
Angee Rozul – mixing, mastering
Eric Lava – recording

Artwork
Cynthia Buazon – cover, design

Certifications

References 

1999 albums
Eraserheads albums